Ritschl is a surname. Notable people with the surname include:

Albrecht Ritschl (1822–1889) German theologian
Albrecht Ritschl (economist)
Otto Ritschl (1860–1944) German theologian, Albrecht's son
Friedrich Wilhelm Ritschl (1806–1876) German classical scholar
Carl Ritschl (1783–1858) German bishop and composer

See also 
Ritschel
Ritz (disambiguation)